Radical 160 or radical bitter meaning "bitter" is one of the 20 Kangxi radicals (214 radicals in total) composed of 7 strokes.

In the Kangxi Dictionary, there are 36 characters (out of 49,030) to be found under this radical.

In the ancient Chinese cyclic character numeral system tiāngān, 辛 represents the eighth Celestial stem.

 is also the 167th indexing component in the Table of Indexing Chinese Character Components predominantly adopted by Simplified Chinese dictionaries published in mainland China.

Evolution

Derived characters

Literature

External links

Unihan Database - U+8F9B

160
167